Seapatrick Football Club is an intermediate-level football club playing in the Intermediate B division of the Mid-Ulster Football League in Northern Ireland.

Honours

Senior honours
Mid-Ulster Cup (3): 1950–51, 1951–52, 1954–55
Mid-Ulster Shield (1): 1988–89 (beating Lurgan Institute 2-1)

References

External links
 Daily Mirror Mid-Ulster Football League Official website
 nifootball.co.uk - (For fixtures, results and tables of all Northern Ireland amateur football leagues)

Association football clubs in Northern Ireland
Association football clubs established in 1947
Association football clubs in County Down
Mid-Ulster Football League clubs
1947 establishments in Northern Ireland